Silchar Lok Sabha constituency is one of the 14 Lok Sabha constituencies in Assam state in north-eastern India. From 1951 to 1971, the area under it was referred as Cachar constituency. The constituency covers the entirety of Cachar district in the Barak Valley.

Vidhan Sabha segments
Silchar Lok Sabha constituency is composed of the following assembly segments:

Members of Lok Sabha

Election Results

Lok Sabha Elections 2019

General elections 2014

Lok Sabha elections 1971
 Jyotsna Chanda (INC) : 100,798 votes   
 A. F. Golam Osmani (IND) : 37,794

Lok Sabha elections 1952
 Two candidates elected from this constituency, then called 'Cachar Lushal Hill'.
 Member One : Laskar, Nibaran Chandra (INC) : 192847 votes, defeated Ghose, Satyendra Kishore (KMPP) : 84160 votes
 Member Two : Deb, Suresh Chandra (INC) : 182,692 votes,  defeated Patni, Nitai Chand (KMPP) : 71,704 votes

See also
 2019 Indian general election in Assam
 Cachar district
 List of Constituencies of the Lok Sabha

References

Lok Sabha constituencies in Assam
Cachar district